The 2019 Missouri State Bears football team represented Missouri State University in the 2019 NCAA Division I FCS football season. They were led by fifth-year head coach Dave Steckel and played their home games at the Robert W. Plaster Stadium. They were a member of the Missouri Valley Football Conference. They finished the season 1–10, 1–7 in MVFC play to finish in a two-way tie for ninth place. 

On January 10, 2020, Steckel was bought out of his contract with Missouri State.

Previous season

The Bears finished the 2018 season 4–7, 2–6 in MVFC play to finish in ninth place.

Preseason

MVFC poll
In the MVFC preseason poll released on July 29, 2019, the Bears were predicted to finish in tenth place.

Preseason All–MVFC team
The Bears had one player selected to the preseason all-MVFC team.

Defense

Angelo Garbutt – LB

Schedule

Game summaries

at Northern Arizona

at Tulane

Kennesaw State

at Western Illinois

South Dakota

at North Dakota State

Northern Iowa

South Dakota State

at Southern Illinois

at Illinois State

Indiana State

References

Missouri State
Missouri State Bears football seasons
Missouri State Bears football